Marcil Elias da Silva, better known as Max (born April 28, 1990) is a Brazilian footballer who plays as a right-back for Palmas.

Career
On 1 October 2010, Max made the goal of the number in 1500 Vasco in the history of Brazilian Championships.

He is currently playing as defender for Mogi Mirim on loan from Vasco da Gama.

Career statistics
(Correct )

References

External links
 ogol.com.br

1990 births
Living people
Brazilian footballers
Campeonato Brasileiro Série A players
Campeonato Brasileiro Série B players
CR Vasco da Gama players
Mogi Mirim Esporte Clube players
Paysandu Sport Club players
Association football fullbacks
Footballers from São Paulo